Daniel R. Liljenquist (born July 10, 1974) is an American businessman and politician who served one term in the Utah State Senate.

Early life and education 
Born in Nashville to Dr. John E. Liljenquist and Colleen Redford Liljenquist, he spent most of his childhood in Idaho Falls, Idaho. After a football injury sidelined him as a high school junior, he became interested in politics. He served as the student body president of his senior class at Skyline High School.

He attended Brigham Young University, graduating magna cum laude with a Bachelor of Arts in Economics in 1998. After graduation, he attended the University of Chicago Law School, graduating with a Juris Doctor in 2001.

Liljenquist spent the summer between his first and second years of law school interning for the Institute for Justice Clinic on Entrepreneurship. He provided pro bono legal assistance as well as business consulting aimed at helping fledgling businesses get off the ground.

Career

Business 
Upon graduating from law school, Liljenquist launched his career as a consultant with Bain & Company, serving in their Dallas, Texas office. He worked at Bain from 2001 to 2003.

In 2003, he joined Affiliated Computer Services, a Fortune 500 Business Process Outsourcing leader. He served as Director of Operational Strategy for Commercial Solutions Group, working out of their Sandy, Utah office.

In 2005, he joined FOCUS Services, LLC and served as its president and chief operating officer until January 2011. He sold his interests in the company in January 2011.

In 2012, he founded Liljenquist Strategies, a strategy consulting company focused on public sector pension and benefits reforms. Also in 2012, he joined Intermountain Healthcare as Director of Special Projects in the Shared Accountability Organization. He began writing a weekly column for the Deseret News in the fall of 2012, and wrote over 200 columns through May 2017.

Dan is now Senior Vice President and Chief Strategy Officer for Intermountain Healthcare, where he oversees Intermountain’s Enterprise Initiative and Market Intelligence & Planning Offices. He is also the lead architect and Board Chair of Civica Rx, a nonprofit generic drug company established to reduce chronic generic drug shortages and price gouging.

He serves on the boards of several non-profit organizations, including the Lucy Burns Institute, which publishes Ballotpedia.

Utah State Senate

2008 election 
In 2008, incumbent state Senator Dan Eastman did not file for re-election. Eight Davis county Republicans filed to take his place. At the 2008 Davis county Republican convention, Liljenquist received 55% of the delegate vote. In the ensuing primary with Ron Mortensen, Liljenquist won 64% of the vote to Mortensen's 36%.

In the November general election, he received 70.40% of the vote to Democrat Richard Watson's 26.2% and Constitution Party candidate Jorgina Hancock's 3.3%.

Tenure 
In his freshman year in the Utah Senate, Liljenquist sponsored SB 126: State Personnel Management Act Amendments that put performance over length of service when considering rehiring public employees, effectively eliminating tenure.

In 2010, Liljenquist addressed pension reform with SB 63, moving Utah to a defined contribution state maxing out at 10%. Spurred by a 30% loss to the state retirement fund in 2008, Liljenquist focused on changing the system for new hires entering after July 1, 2011, moving away from a defined benefit program to a defined contribution plan. He also successfully sponsored a companion bill, SB 43 that did away with the so-called practice of "double-dipping." His bill also eliminated pensions for state legislators.

In 2011, Liljenquist was the sponsor of Utah's Medicaid reform. SB 180, which passed unanimously, proposed block granting Medicaid funds to Utah, switching from a fee-for-service model to a managed care system, and making Utah the first state in the nation to cap Medicaid growth. The reforms were estimated to save $2.5 billion on total funds in the first seven years of its implementation by making sure many Utahns didn't get the access to healthcare they needed. .

During his tenure in the State Senate, Liljenquist served on the Appropriations, Standing, and Interim committee.

Governing Magazine named him a 2011 "Public Official of the Year" for his work on both pension and Medicaid reform. FreedomWorks named him their "Legislative Entrepreneur of the Year" in November 2011.

2012 U.S. Senate election 

On December 15, 2011, Liljenquist resigned from the Utah State Senate. On January 4, 2012, during an interview with Doug Wright on KSL, Liljenquist announced his intention to challenge longtime incumbent U.S. Senator Orrin Hatch. With ten Republican candidates in the race through the state convention, Liljenquist won 40.8% of the delegate vote, forcing Hatch into his first primary since 1976. Hatch spent $10.5 million in the primary. In the June 2012 primary election, Liljenquist lost to Hatch, receiving 33.5% of the vote to Hatch's 66.5%.

Personal life 
Liljenquist is married and has six children. In June 2008, Liljenquist was injured in the 2008 Aéreo Ruta Maya crash. Liljenquist had been traveling in Guatemala with CHOICE Humanitarian when the plane crashed in a field due to an engine failure. Eleven of the fourteen people aboard the aircraft died. Liljenquist broke his right leg and left ankle in multiple places. He is a member of the Church of Jesus Christ of Latter-day Saints.

References 

1974 births
Living people
Latter Day Saints from Tennessee
Latter Day Saints from Idaho
Latter Day Saints from Utah
Latter Day Saints from Illinois
American management consultants
Brigham Young University alumni
Businesspeople from Utah
People from Bountiful, Utah
People from Idaho Falls, Idaho
Politicians from Nashville, Tennessee
Survivors of aviation accidents or incidents
University of Chicago Law School alumni
Republican Party Utah state senators
21st-century American politicians
People associated with Kirkland & Ellis